The Bee  (Arabic: الْنَّحْل; an-nahl) is the 16th chapter (sūrah) of the Qur'an, with 128 verses (āyāt). It is named after honey bees mentioned in verse 68, and contains a comparison of the industry and adaptability of honey bees with the industry of man.  Regarding the timing and contextual background of the believed revelation (asbāb al-nuzūl), it is an earlier "Meccan surah", which means it is believed to have been revealed in Mecca, instead of later in Medina.

Summary
1 God’s judgment sure to be visited on the infidels
2 Revelation is from God by the ministry of angels
3–8 God the Creator, as his works testify
9 God the true instructor of man
10–14 His works in heaven, earth, and sea described
15 The earth made firm by the mountains
16 The stars appointed to guide man
17 God not to be compared to idols
18–19 God merciful and omniscient
20–22 The character of the idols declared
23 Infidels reject the one true God
24–25 The Omniscient hates the proud
26 Muhammad charged with forgery
27–28 The unbelievers shall be destroyed
29–31 Idolaters will be disappointed in the resurrection
32–34 The reward of the righteous
35–36 Infidels can only look for judgment
37 They lay their crimes to God’s charge
38 Every nation has its own prophet
38–39 The dreadful end of infidelity
40 The infidels deny the resurrection
41 They shall be taught their error
42 God creates by a word
43 Promises to the Muhájirín
44 The patient believer will be rewarded
45 The custodians of the Scriptures to be inquired of
46  The Quran sent to be proclaimed to the people
47–49 The Prophet’s enemies will be punished
۩ 50–52 All God’s creatures worship him
53–55 The true God to be worshipped and obeyed
56–58 Idolaters are ungrateful
59–61 Hating daughters, the Quraish attribute daughters to God
62–63 The human race dependent on God’s mercy
64 Idolatry unreasonable
65 Satan the patron of the ungodly
66 Why the Quran was sent
67–69 God’s witness to himself in nature
70–71 The bee taught of God
72–74 All man is and all he has is of God
75 Yet man worships idols
76 God not to be likened to anything
77 The parable of a slave and his master
78 The parable of the blind man and one having sight
79 The affairs of the judgment-day shall be accomplished in a moment
80–83 God to be obeyed because he is Creator and Preserver
84 Muhammad only a public preacher
85 Idolaters recognise God’s mercy and yet deny him
86–87 Every nation has a witness against it
88–89 Idolaters shall be deserted by their idols
90 Infidel leaders to be severely punished
91 Muhammad is God’s witness against the Arabians
92–99 Exhortation to loyalty to God
100 Muhammad to have recourse to God in reading the Quran
101–102 Satan has no power over believers
103 The doctrine of abrogation announced
104 The Quran sent down by the “holy spirit”
105 Muhammad charged with writing the Quran with foreign help
106–107 The unbelievers shall be punished
108 Forced apostasy no offence against God
108–110 Wilful apostates condemned
111 The Muhájirín blessed
112 The rewards of the judgment-day will be just
113–114 Makkah punished by famine for unbelief
115–119 Lawful and unlawful food
120 Sins of ignorance may be pardoned
121–124 Muhammad exhorted to adopt the religion of Abraham
125 Friday to be observed instead of the Sabbath
126 Infidels not to be treated harshly
127 Patient forbearance better than vengeance
128 God is with the righteous  

This surah warns against polytheism, saying that the pagan gods cannot create anything, and against comparisons between God and any created beings. It praises God for giving the Earth with all its wealth to mankind. According to this surah, all wonders of the natural world, such as seas, stars and mountains, are proofs of God's infinite power. Verse 66 speaks of the miracle in milk formation in cattle: "From what is within their bodies, between excretions and blood, We produce for your drink, milk, pure and agreeable to those who drink it." Verse 67 speaks of the miracle of the vine: "And from the fruit of the date-palm and the vine, ye get out strong drink and wholesome food: behold, in this also is a sign for those who are wise". Quran 16:103 addresses the allegations that Muhammad has invented the Qur'an.

References

External links 
Q16:68, 50+ translations, islamawakened.com
Quran 16 Clear Quran translation
Surah An-Nahl Transliteration and Arabic Text

Nahl
Bees in popular culture